Braywick Park is a   Local Nature Reserve in the Braywick suburb of Maidenhead in Berkshire. It is owned and managed by Royal Borough of Windsor and Maidenhead.

Geography and site
The park features formal parkland with trees and wildlife habitats including grassland, woodland and a pond.

History
The park was originally part of the estate belonging to Braywick Lodge.
In 1969, the 19th century mansion was demolished, but the stables were saved and refurbished in 1989 to provide a nature centre.

In 1999  the site was declared as a local nature reserve by the Royal Borough of Windsor and Maidenhead.

Fauna
The site has the following fauna:

Mammals
European rabbit

Birds
Red kite

References

Local Nature Reserves in Berkshire
Parks and open spaces in Berkshire